Dimitri Vyacheslavovich Gusakov (also transliterated Dmitri, Dmitry, or Dimitry; born February 15, 1971) is a member for the LDPR of the State Duma of Russia. He is a member of the State Duma's Committee on Manufacturing, Construction, Science and Technology.   He has attended St. Petersburg State University. He has a degree in philosophy.

1971 births
Living people
Fourth convocation members of the State Duma (Russian Federation)
Liberal Democratic Party of Russia politicians